WXXI-TV (channel 21) is a PBS member television station in Rochester, New York, United States. It is owned by the WXXI Public Broadcasting Council alongside NPR members WXXI (1370 AM) and WXXI-FM (91.5). The three outlets share studios at 280 State Street near downtown Rochester; WXXI-TV's transmitter is located on Pinnacle Hill on the border between Rochester and Brighton.

Programming

National productions
WXXI-TV's national public television productions include A Warrior in Two Worlds, Echoes from the Ancients, Out of the Fire, Albert Paley: Man of Steel, Biz Kid$, and Flight to Freedom. WXXI-TV also produced Assignment: The World, a weekly current-events program for schools, which aired on approximately 100 public television stations nationwide, and was the nation's longest-running instructional television program. Due to funding cuts, it was canceled and its last episode aired on May 23, 2013.

Former programming

ThinkBright, broadcast from 6 p.m. to 6 a.m. on 21.3 until the digital transition.

Technical information

Subchannels
WXXI-TV entered the digital era in September 2003 when it signed on with Rochester's first full-power digital television signal.

The station's digital signal is multiplexed:

Channel 21.4, now PBS Kids since February 1, 2016, was originally a digital standard definition simulcast of WXXI-TV's analog signal.

Analog-to-digital conversion
WXXI-TV discontinued regular programming on its analog signal, over UHF channel 21, on June 12, 2009, the official date in which full-power television stations in the United States transitioned from analog to digital broadcasts under federal mandate. The station's digital signal remained on its pre-transition UHF channel 16. Through the use of PSIP, digital television receivers display the station's virtual channel as its former UHF analog channel 21.

As part of the SAFER Act, WXXI-TV kept its analog signal on the air until July 10, 2009 to inform viewers of the digital television transition through a loop of public service announcements from the National Association of Broadcasters. WXXI-TV had been awarded a $202,498 federal contract for an outreach initiative to help Rochester's over-the-air viewers prepare for the digital transition.

References

External links

John S. Porter papers, at the University of Maryland libraries. Porter served as the president and general manager from 1966 to 1969.

XXI-TV
PBS member stations
Television channels and stations established in 1966
1966 establishments in New York (state)